And Thou Shalt Love (translit. V'ahavta) is an Israeli short film. It was directed by Chaim Elbaum. The film examines the difficulties of being both an Orthodox Jew and gay. The story is based on Elbaum's experiences with being gay.

It won the best drama award at the 2008 Jerusalem Film Festival.

Plot
Ohad, the protagonist, is serving in the Israel Defense Forces as a Hesder student. He has not told anyone that he is gay. He tries various ways of dealing with the conflict between his religious beliefs and his sexual orientation, including Atzat Nefesh. He is told to spend forty days fasting and repenting to help rid him of his homosexual inclinations. He does this and believes himself to be cured.

After this, his best friend, Nir, returns from leave. Ohed is torn between his homosexuality and his religion. The film deals with the struggles Ohed faces when it comes to loving God and loving Nir.

Cast

See also
 Homosexuality and Judaism
 Trembling Before G-d (2001)
 Say Amen (2005) a documentary about a gay man coming out to his Orthodox family
 Paper Dolls (film)
 Yossi and Jagger (2002) an Israeli romantic drama film about two soldiers on the Israel – Lebanon border

References

 Jerusalem Film Festival
 
 
Jerusalem Post article 
Haaretz article

External links
 Official site 
 

2007 films
2007 drama films
Films critical of Judaism and Jews
Gay-related films
Israeli LGBT-related films
Films about LGBT and Judaism
Israeli short films
LGBT-related drama films
Israeli drama films
Films about Orthodox and Hasidic Jews
2007 LGBT-related films
Anti-Orthodox Judaism sentiment